Pedro Miguel da Câmara Pinheiro (born 17 February 1977) is a Portuguese retired footballer who played as a midfielder.

Football career
Pinheiro was born in Vila Nova de Gaia, Porto District. After beginning professionally with local S.C. Dragões Sandinenses, he made his Primeira Liga debuts with Barcelos-based Gil Vicente FC, spending the following campaign with A.D. Ovarense in the second division.

After three seasons with G.D. Estoril Praia, Pinheiro moved to C.F. Os Belenenses: regularly used in his first year, he only appeared in 11 games in the second. Subsequently, he would be essential in C.D. Trofense's first ever top level promotion, scoring six goals while playing in all 30 matches.

In June 2009, utility player Pinheiro returned to division two, signing with C.D. Feirense. Regularly used in his debut season, he only featured in seven contests in the following as the Santa Maria da Feira club returned to the top flight after a 23-year absence, being released shortly after at the age of 34 and resuming his career in the regional leagues.

External links

1977 births
Living people
Sportspeople from Vila Nova de Gaia
Portuguese footballers
Association football midfielders
Primeira Liga players
Liga Portugal 2 players
Segunda Divisão players
CD Candal players
S.C. Dragões Sandinenses players
Gil Vicente F.C. players
A.D. Ovarense players
G.D. Estoril Praia players
C.F. Os Belenenses players
C.D. Trofense players
C.D. Feirense players
S.C. Salgueiros players
S.C. Coimbrões players